The 2022–23 Fresno State Bulldogs men's basketball team represented California State University, Fresno in the 2022–23 NCAA Division I men's basketball season. The Bulldogs were led by fifth-year head coach Justin Hutson and played their home games at the Save Mart Center as members of the Mountain West Conference.

Previous season
The Bulldogs finished the 2021–22 season 23–13, 8–9 in Mountain West play to finish in sixth place. They defeated San Jose State in the first round of the Mountain West tournament before losing to San Diego State State in the quarterfinals. Ther were invited to The Basketball Classic where they defeated Eastern Washington, Youngstown State, Southern Utah and Coastal Carolina to win The Basketball Classic.

Offseason

Departures

Incoming transfers

Recruiting classes

2022 recruiting class

Roster

Schedule and results

|-
!colspan=12 style=| Exhibition

|-
!colspan=12 style=| Regular season

|-
!colspan=12 style=| Mountain West tournament

Source

References

Fresno State Bulldogs men's basketball seasons
Fresno State
Fresno State
Fresno State